Eakle is an unincorporated community in Clay County, West Virginia, United States. Its post office  is closed.

References 

Unincorporated communities in West Virginia
Unincorporated communities in Clay County, West Virginia
Charleston, West Virginia metropolitan area